Magway Stadium is a multi-use stadium in Magway, Burma.  It is currently used mostly for football matches and is the home ground of Magway FC of the Myanmar National League.  The stadium has a capacity of 7,000 spectators.

External links 
 Stadium information

Football venues in Myanmar